|}

The Savills Chase is a Grade 1 National Hunt steeplechase in Ireland which is open to horses aged five years or older. It is run at Leopardstown over a distance of about 3 miles (4,828 metres), and during its running there are seventeen fences to be jumped. The race is scheduled to take place each year during the Christmas Festival meeting in late December.

It was first run over its present distance in 1992, when it became known as the Ericsson Chase. This replaced an earlier event, the Black and White Whisky Champion Chase, which had been run mostly over 2½ miles since 1986. From 2004 to 2016 the race was sponsored by Lexus and run as the Lexus Chase. The company ended their sponsorship in November 2017 and the race was run as the Leopardstown Christmas Chase. In 2018 the property company Savills took over the sponsorship and the race was given its present title.

Records
Most successful horse (3 wins):
 Beef or Salmon – 2002,2004,2005

Leading jockey (4 wins):
 Paul Carberry – Dorans Pride (1998), Beef or Salmon (2004,2005), Pandorama (2010)

Leading trainer (5 wins):
 Michael Hourigan – 	Deep Bramble (1993), Dorans Pride (1998), Beef or Salmon (2002,2004,2005)

Winners

See also
 Horse racing in Ireland
 List of Irish National Hunt races

References

 Racing Post:

 leopardstown.com – Lexus Chase.

National Hunt races in Ireland
National Hunt chases
Leopardstown Racecourse